Opeas is a genus of small, tropical, air-breathing land snails, terrestrial pulmonate gastropod mollusks in the family Achatinidae.

Opeas is the type genus of the subfamily Opeatinae.

Species 
The genus Opeas includes the following species:
Opeas bocourtianum bocourtianum Crosse  & Fischer, 1869
Opeas bocourtianum pittieri Martens, 1898
Opeas clavulinum
 Opeas funiculare
 Opeas gracile
Opeas guatemalense Strebel, 1882
 Opeas hannense (Rang, 1831)
Opeas pumilum  Pfeiffer, 1840
 Opeas pyrgula Schumacker & Boettger, 1891
 Opeas setchuanense
 Opeas striatissimum
 Opeas utriculus

References

External links
 

Achatinidae